The Wormwood Review was a literary magazine published from Fall 1959 to April 1999. Alan Kaufman considered the magazine to be "the greatest little magazine of all time."

History and profile
The Wormwood Review was first published in Fall 1959 in Mt. Hope, Connecticut. The founding editors were Alexander (Sandy) Taylor, James Scully, and Morton Felix. It was also edited and published by Marvin Malone. Later, the magazine moved to Stockton, California. Poets published by the magazine included Charles Bukowski, Gregory Corso, e.e. cummings, James Dickey, Jack Micheline, Peter Orlovsky, and William Wantling.

The magazine organized the annual Wormwood Award. The last issue of the Wormwood Review was published in April 1999.

Notable contributors

Douglas Blazek
Bertolt Brecht
Charles Bukowski
William S. Burroughs
Neeli Cherkovski
Gregory Corso

e.e. cummings
James Dickey
Jules Feiffer
Paul Fericano
Edsel Ford
Günter Grass

Linda King
Gerald Locklin
Gerard Malanga
Al Masarik
Jack Micheline
Henry Miller
Peter Orlovsky

Ben Pleasants
Steve Richmond
James Valvis
William Wantling
Charles Harper Webb
Philip Weidman

References

External links
Official Website of The Wormwood Review

Quarterly magazines published in the United States
Defunct literary magazines published in the United States
Magazines established in 1959
Magazines disestablished in 1999
Magazines published in California
Magazines published in Connecticut
Poetry magazines published in the United States